Gavin Arroyo (born May 10, 1972, in Orange, California) is a former water polo defender from the United States, who competed in two Summer Olympics (1996 and 2000) for his native country. He was part of the United States national team that won the gold medal in the 1997 FINA World Cup in Athens.

At club level, he played overseas in Greece for Olympiacos, Vouliagmeni, Glyfada and in Spain for Barcelona and CN Atlètic-Barceloneta. As a member of Olympiacos from 1997 to 1999, Arroyo won the Greek Championship (1999), the Greek Cup (1998) and the Greek Super Cup (1998) and was twice runner-up of the LEN Cup Winners' Cup in 1998 and 1999.

In 2020, Arroyo was inducted into the USA Water Polo Hall of Fame.

References

External links
 
 Gavin Arroyo profile at h2opolo.com

1972 births
Living people
American male water polo players
Olympic water polo players of the United States
Water polo players at the 1996 Summer Olympics
Water polo players at the 2000 Summer Olympics
Olympiacos Water Polo Club players
Pan American Games gold medalists for the United States
Pan American Games medalists in water polo
Sportspeople from Orange, California
Water polo players at the 1995 Pan American Games
Water polo players at the 1999 Pan American Games
American water polo coaches
Medalists at the 1995 Pan American Games
Medalists at the 1999 Pan American Games